The 2013 Saudi Crown Prince Cup Final was the 38th final of the Crown Prince Cup. It took place on 22 February 2013 at the King Fahd International Stadium in Riyadh, Saudi Arabia and was contested between Al-Hilal and Al-Nassr. It was Al-Hilal's 13th Crown Prince Cup final and Al-Nassr's fifth final. This was the first meeting between these two clubs in the final. In addition, this was Al-Nassr's first final since 1996.

Al-Hilal won 4–2 on a penalty shoot-out after a 1–1 draw at the end of extra time, securing a record-extending 12th title in the competition and their sixth one in a row.

Teams

Venue

The King Fahd International Stadium was announced as the host of the final venue. This was the twelfth Crown Prince Cup final hosted in the King Fahd International Stadium following those in 1992, 1994, 1998, 2003, 2004, 2005, 2006, 2008, 2009, 2010, and 2012.

The King Fahd International Stadium was built in 1982 and was opened in 1987. The stadium was used as a venue for the 1992, 1995, and the 1997 editions of the FIFA Confederations Cup. Its current capacity is 68,752 and it is used by the Saudi Arabia national football team, Al-Nassr, Al-Shabab, and major domestic matches.

Background
Al-Hilal reached a record 13th final after a 1–0 away win to Al-Faisaly. This was Al-Hilal's sixth final in a row. Previously, they won finals in 1964, 1995, 2000, 2003, 2005, 2006, 2008, 2009, 2010, 2011, and 2012, and lost in 1999.

Al-Nassr reached their fifth final, after a 2–0 away win to Al-Raed. They reached their first final since 1996 when they finished as runners-up after losing to Al-Shabab.

This was the first meeting between these two sides in the Crown Prince Cup final. This was the ninth meeting between these two sides in the Crown Prince Cup; Al-Hilal won 7 times while Al-Nassr won once in 1973. The two teams played each other twice in the season prior to the final with both teams winning once.

Road to the final 

Key: (H) = Home; (A) = Away

Match

Details

{| width="100%"
|valign="top" width="40%"|

See also

 2012–13 Saudi Crown Prince Cup
 2012–13 Saudi Professional League
 2013 King Cup of Champions

References

External links

Sports competitions in Saudi Arabia
February 2013 sports events in Asia
Al Hilal SFC matches
Al Nassr FC matches